Hagood may refer to:

Places
Hagood, South Carolina, unincorporated community in Sumter County, South Carolina, United States
Hagood-Mauldin House, on the National Register of Historic Places, in Pickens, South Carolina
Hagood Mill, operational water-powered gristmill built in 1845 by James Hagood near Pickens, South Carolina

People

Given name
Hagood Clarke (born 1942), American former college and professional football player
Hagood Hardy, CM (1937–1997), Canadian composer, pianist, and vibraphonist

Surname
E. Allison Hagood (born 1966), American Professor of psychology and author
Jay Hagood (born 1973), former American football offensive lineman
Johnson Hagood (general) (1873–1948), served in France in World War I
Johnson Hagood (governor) (1829–1898), 80th Governor of South Carolina from 1880 to 1882
Kenny Hagood ("Pancho" Hagood) (1926–1989), American jazz vocalist
Margaret Jarman Hagood "Marney" Hagood (1907–1963), American sociologist and demographer

See also
Hagood Creek Petroglyph Site, county-owned museum at Hagood Mill Historic Site in Pickens County, South Carolina
Johnson Hagood Stadium, is an 11,500-seat football stadium in Charleston, South Carolina, USA
Habgood
Hapgood (disambiguation)
Hargood (disambiguation)
Hawgood
Haygood